Nathaniel Peat is a social entrepreneur and international motivational speaker. At age 25, he founded the nonprofit organization The Safety Box, which uses grassroots methods to interrupt violent behaviour, build entrepreneurship and foster achievement in young people using alternative curriculum in British schools. He is a regular television and radio commentator on youth and education.

2008 saw him feature on UK based BBC Three reality TV show The Last Millionaire where he was the winner of the third episode in Cairo.

Peat was listed on the Courvoisier Observers Future 500 Next Generation List in 2009. He was a key organiser and speaker of the first Youth Jamaica Diaspora Future Leaders Conference. The conference gained national TV exposure, inclusion in the national radio programs and was featured in all national newspapers. In 2011 he became the first UK Future Leader Jamaica Diaspora Advisory Board member to the minister responsible for Diaspora Affairs within the Jamaican Government.

In 2011 Peat received the Alumnus of the Year medal from Brunel University for outstanding achievement. Later that year he received the London Peace (DREAM) award at City Hall from former London Mayor (former UK Prime Minister) Boris Johnson. In July 2011 Peat spoke at Barclays global headquarters alongside Marcus Agius, and Sir Steve Bullock to encourage entrepreneurship among young people. In 2013, Peat was the winner of the Universal Peace Federation Youth Achievement Award. In 2015 he was the only UK entrepreneur selected by Virgin Unite to attend a week long leadership gathering on Necker Island with Sir Richard Branson for his business GeNNex, which empowers communities through Solar in developing countries. Peat was honoured in June 2015 by Kings House where he received the Governor General Award for Excellence from Sir Patrick Allen ON, GCMG, CD, K.St.J. In 2016 he was listed in the Upstanding 100 Powerlist published by the Financial Times, recognised as an influential BME executive across the US, UK and Ireland. In 2017 he was listed in the UK Black Power List, 100 EMpower List published by the Financial Times and BAME Top 100 Board Index List. In 2018 he was invited to become a fellow of St George House, fellowship of leaders at Windsor Castle and was listed in the EMpower 100 (Ethnic Minority Power) List published by the  Financial Times. On 11 December 2019, Peat was awarded the Honorary Fellowship of Brunel University in recognition of his achievements and outstanding support of the University by Sir Richard Sykes Chancellor of the University. In 2020 Peat was elected as the UK (South) Global Jamaica Diaspora Council representative to the Government of Jamaica and voted to become the Chair of Brunel University Business School. In 2021 Mr Peat was invited to sit on Lloyds Banking Group Black Business Advisory Committee.

G20 summit 

In 2010 Peat represented Great Britain as a youth delegate for the G20 Toronto young entrepreneurs summit 2010.

Powerlist 
In October 2016 Peat was listed in the 2017 Powerlist. In January 2011 Peat was listed in the under 40s section of the Powerlist 2011.

Diana Award (Jamaica) 

In 2012 Peat was instrumental in assisting the Diana Award to expand internationally into Jamaica, and former 100m world record holder Asafa Powell became the first International Diana Award Ambassador. On the visit he met with the Governor General, Sir Patrick Allen ON, GCMG, CD, former British High Commissioner to Jamaica Howard Drake OBE and the Jamaican Gov. former Minister of Youth and Culture Lisa Hanna.

BBC The Last Millionaire 

In 2008 Nathaniel Peat took part in the UK based BBC Three reality TV show The Last Millionaire, and he was the winner of the third episode in Cairo.

Financial Times Upstanding 100 BME Executive List 

In 2016 Peat was listed in The Financial Times UPstanding Leaders Powerlist.

In November 2018, Peat was named to the Financial Times' list of the 'Top 100 minority ethnic leaders in technology.'

Awards and achievements 
 2008 - Winner of BBC Three entrepreneur reality TV show The Last Millionaire, Cairo

 2009 - Listed in The Observers Entrepreneurs to watch
 2009 - Listed in Courvoisier Future 500
 2011 - Listed in Powerful Media Black Powerlist of Britain's most influential black people (under 40s)
 2011 - Brunel University Alumnus of the Year Winner
 2011 - Winner of London Peace Award, City Hall
 2013 - Winner of UPF Youth Achievement Award
 2013 - Winner of Precious Award "Man of the Year"
 2014 - International Achievement Award "Role Model of the year"
 2014 - Appointed Trustee to EY Foundation (Ernst & Young Foundation) 
 2015 - JCI TOYP Award Winner UK 
 2015 - Governor General Award of Excellence (Jamaica) "Diaspora Region"
 2015 - Finalist in the Black British business awards
 2016 - Listed in Financial Times Upstanding 100 BME Most Powerful Diversity Executives across USA, UK and Ireland
 2017 - Listed in Financial Times EMpower 100 BME Most Powerful Executives across UK and Ireland 
 2017 - Listed in Powerful Media, Black Power List of Britain's most influential black people.
 2017 - Listed in Green Park BAME Top 100 Board Talent Index
 2018 - Patron EY Foundation (Ernst & Young Foundation) 
 2018 - Fellow of the Society of Leadership Fellows, St Georges House, Windsor Castle 
 2018 - Listed in Financial Times EMpower 100 Most Powerful Ethnic Executives across UK and Ireland
 2018 - Listed in Green Parks Top 100 BAME Business Leaders in the UK
 2018 - Listed in Financial Times 100 Most influential BAME tech leaders in the UK 
 2019 - Featured in Forbes 6 Renewable Energy Entrepreneurs Lighting up Jamaica
 2019 - Awarded Honorary Fellowship of Brunel University.
 2020 - Elected Global Jamaica Diaspora Council Representative for UK (South)
 2020 - Advisory Board Chair Brunel University Business School
 2021 - Lloyds Banking Group plc Black Business Advisory Board 
 2022 - Winner of BLAC award sponsored by the Royal Airforce

Other interests 

Peat is the co-founder of GeNNex Elite; a technology company specializing in solar and renewable energy products. He is a qualified pilot, avid musician and 6th degree (dan) black belt in Okinawa Gōjū-ryū (剛柔流) with the Shōgō (称号, "title", "name", "degree") of Kyōshi (教士) of the Japanese honorifics, in his capacity as a karateka, Peat is also Jamaica's World Representative to the WKF and is a direct student of Shihan Kyōshi (教士:きょうし) Ronald Yamanaka who was a student of the late Eiichi Miyazato.

References

External links
 Canada Financial Post, Entrepreneurs of the G20
 The Guardian, Social Enterprise in Greece, UK delegation - Nathaniel Peat
 UK Role Models, Nathaniel Peat

British businesspeople
English people of Jamaican descent
Living people
Alumni of Brunel University London
Year of birth missing (living people)